Ammomanes is a genus of lark in the family Alaudidae.

Taxonomy and systematics

Extant species
It contains the following three species:

Additionally, some authorities continue to place Gray's lark within the genus Ammomanes.

Former species
Other species, or subspecies, formerly considered as species in the genus Ammomanes include:
 Gray's lark ( as Ammomanes grayi)
 Red lark (as Ammomanes burra or Ammomanes burrus)
 Barlow's lark (as Pseudammomanes barlowi)
 Dunn's lark (as Ammomanes dunni)

References

 
Bird genera
Taxonomy articles created by Polbot